Cara Black and Liezel Huber were the defending champions, and won in the final, 6–3, 6–3, over Maria Kirilenko and Agnieszka Radwańska.

Seeds
The top four seeds receive a bye into the second round.

Draw

Finals

Top half

Bottom half

External links
Draw

Dubai Tennis Championships - Women's Doubles
2009 Dubai Tennis Championships